The Honda Ridgeline is a midsize pickup truck manufactured by Honda. The Ridgeline is the only pickup truck currently produced by Honda. The Ridgeline is built using a unibody frame, a transverse-mounted engine, and is only offered in a crew–cab short-box configuration with one powertrain.

First generation (YK1; 2006) 

The first generation Ridgeline went on sale in March 2005 as a 2006 model year vehicle.   According to the author of The Car Design Yearbook, the Ridgeline was "Honda's first foray into the true heartland of the American automotive way of life—the pickup truck."  It was designed and engineered by an engineering team from Honda R&D Americas, led by Gary Flint.  According to the author of Driving Honda, the automaker wanted to target buyers who were looking to transition out of sedans, minivans, and sport utility vehicles (SUV) into pickups.

The development started in 2001 when the engineering team began experimenting with their first development mule, an extended version of a first generation Acura MDX with a competitor's pickup bed integrated into the rear structure.  After four years of development, the final design was revealed to the public as Honda's Sport Utility Truck Concept at the 2004 North American International Auto Show.  Later that same year, Honda unveiled a revised version of their pickup concept at the Specialty Equipment Market Association show and announced the official name of the vehicle, the Ridgeline.  The production version of the Ridgeline was unveiled the following year at the 2005 North American International Auto Show.

Honda's publications state that the first generation Ridgeline shared only 7% of its components with other Honda vehicles.  Its powertrain resembled the one used in the first generation Acura MDX but was "extensively calibrated and strengthened" for heavier hauling and towing duties.

Production of the first generation Ridgeline ended in early 2015.

Second generation (YK2/3; 2017) 

After a one-year hiatus in Ridgeline production, the second generation of their mid-size truck went on sale in June 2016 as a 2017 model year vehicle.  The second generation Ridgeline took a different approach in design from the first generation Ridgeline by sharing Honda's new "global light truck platform," found in the third generation Honda Pilot as well as other large Honda vehicles.  However, Honda did have to modify the Pilot platform in order to support their second generation pickup, including extending the wheelbase and modifying various parts to support hauling, towing, and off-road use. Despite these modifications, Honda has stated that 73% of the second generation Ridgeline's components remain common in some way with the third generation Pilot.

Honda has stated that nearly every major component has been beefed up with a 17% stronger front structure, a 31% sturdier rear, and 50% of the chassis' components changed or were strengthened for the second generation Ridgeline. The second generation Ridgeline's new structure gives it an average  reduction in weight from the first generation pickup.  The C-pillar and rear subframe were strengthened giving the second generation 28% more torsional rigidity over the first generation Ridgeline.

Marketing 
In addition to being a unibody pickup with a transverse-mounted engine, and a crew-cab short-box configuration, Honda and some automotive journalists have described other noteworthy aspects of the Ridgeline.

Some in the automotive press that have studied the first generation Ridgeline, such as PickupTrucks.com, consider it "one of those odd vehicles."  They wrote, "The Ridgeline can't really do what most people who like trucks need it to do."  Others in the automotive press, such as The Driver's Seat TV, had differing views and call the Ridgeline, "the Swiss Army knife of trucks." They also called the Ridgeline "the anti-truck" and summarized their view by saying "the Ridgeline scores high on practicality but very low on image."

Compared to the first generation Ridgeline, Honda's second generation Ridgeline has the automotive press changing its tune, yet it still has an image problem. Gearheads.org wrote the "2017 Honda Ridgeline still won’t get respect but should" stating, its "downside is going to be looks." Car and Driver wrote, "The company [Honda] readily admits that the problem with the first generation pickup was that the styling was off-putting, but then it went ahead and made the next iteration of the truck just as unconventional as before." "The Ridgeline’s roomy cabin, ample storage, smooth ride, and innovative touches make its rivals seem outdated. ...it not only has cargo space, but also the makings of a great tailgate party..."

Karl Forster, a member of the SAE trailer towing group who was vehicle dynamics project leader on Honda's unibody Ridgeline pickup and Pilot SUV, says Honda's ratings come from actual customer usage. "We spent a fair amount of time observing and talking to light-truck customers to understand how they use and load their vehicles and how they tow trailers," he says. "For the Ridgeline, our survey found out that 84 percent of truck buyers tow 5000 pounds or less."

Production and sales
According to Honda, the Ridgeline was not designed to steal sales from the more traditional trucks sold in North America, but was developed to "give the 18% of Honda owners who also own pickups a chance to make their garages a Honda-only parking area."  Despite the first generation Ridgeline's poor sales, according to the author of Driving Honda, this mid-size pickup was one of the more profitable vehicles for Honda with reported sales in over 20 countries.

The second generation Ridgeline sales appeared to start strong but comparing sales in the US between 2017 and 2018 shows a 12% decline overall.  A 2018 Autoline Daily report stated the Ridgeline is the only mid-size truck in North America whose sales are down in a market that "suggests there’s room for more players."

Awards
 North American Car of the Year for 2006 and 2017.
 Canadian Car of the Year and Best New Pickup for 2006
 MotorTrend's 2006 Truck of the Year
 ''Car and Drivers #1 mid-size truck for 2006, and 2017–2019Unique and Highly Capable Honda Ridgeline Named to Car and Driver Magazine List of the 2018 10Best Trucks and SUVs , Hondanews.com, dated 10 January 2018, last accessed 5 March 2018
 Autobytel's 2006 Truck of the Year
 Sobre Ruedas (On Wheels, a Latin American automotive magazine) 2005 Best Pick-up Truck
 Auto123.com's 2017 Pickup of the Year
 J.D. Power and Associates' Automotive Performance, Execution, and Layout (APEAL) Award for 2006–2008, 2017, and 2018
 Green Car Journal'''s 2017 Green Truck of the Year
 Consumer Guide Automotive's Best Buy Award for 2017–20192018 Honda Ridgeline Best Buy Review , Consumer Guide Automotive, last accessed 18 January 2018
 Kelley Blue Book's Top Ten Best Resale Value Award for 2017–20192018 Best Resale Value Awards: Top Ten Cars , Kelley Blue Book, last accessed 3 February 2018 
 The Car Connection's Best Pickup to Buy for 2018
 Women's Choice Awards in the Eco-Friendly and Safety categories for 2018
 Popular Mechanics 2006 Automotive Excellence Award for functionality
 Society of Plastics Engineers 2006 Grand Award for the composite in–bed trunk
 National Highway Traffic Safety Administration's first four-door pickup to earn five-star safety rating
 IIHS's first pickup to earn the Top Safety Pick-Plus award (2017) and has also earned the Top Safety Pick award for 2009, 2012, 2013, and is the only pickup to earn the award for 2018 and 2019
 SCORE Baja off-road race winner in the Stock Mini Class in 2008 and 2010 as well as Class 7 in 2015, 2016, 2018, and 2019
 iSeeCars.com's longest-lasting truck, most likely to reach 200,000 miles

References

External links

 Honda Ridgeline Owners Club (ROC) forum
 The Story Behind The Honda Ridgeline's Wildly, Unusually Detailed Wikipedia Page

Ridgeline
Pickup trucks
All-wheel-drive vehicles
Goods manufactured in Canada
2010s cars
Sport utility trucks
Cars introduced in 2005
Motor vehicles manufactured in the United States